Ivan Dokić (born 25 March 2000) is a Serbian professional footballer who plays as a goalkeeper for Greek Super League 2 club Almopos Aridea.

Club career

Spartak Subotica
Born in Novi Sad, Dokić started playing football at the age of 4. After he spent a period with FK Srbobran, Dokić moved to Spartak Subotica where he passed through the categories. He signed a scholarship contract with the club in 2016, being licensed with the first team for the 2017–18 Serbian SuperLiga season. Dokić made his senior debut for Spartak Subotica in the last season fixture under coach Andrey Chernyshov, replacing Miloš Ostojić in 58 minute of the match against OFK Bačka, played on 21 May 2017. In summer 2017, Dokić moved on a half-season loan deal to Bačka 1901.

International career
Dokić was called into the Serbia national under-16 football team squad in 2016, making an appearance, in matches against Montenegro at the memorial tournament dedicated to Miljan Miljanić. He also made his debut for Serbian U17 national level in a friendly match against Kazakhstan, played on 26 July 2016.

Career statistics

References

External links
 
 
 

2000 births
Living people
Footballers from Novi Sad
Association football goalkeepers
Serbian footballers
Serbian expatriate footballers
FK Spartak Subotica players
FK Bačka 1901 players
FK Radnički Pirot players
Almopos Aridea F.C. players
Serbian SuperLiga players
Serbian First League players
Serbian League players
Super League Greece 2 players
Serbian expatriate sportspeople in Greece
Expatriate footballers in Greece